Masked Emotions is a 1929 American silent adventure crime drama film produced and distributed by Fox Film Corporation starring George O'Brien and Nora Lane. The screenplay was adapted from Ben Ames Williams' short story Son of Anak. David Butler began as director but had to leave the production to attend to a family emergency, and Kenneth Hawks then assumed directorial duties. The Western Electric Sound System was used for the musical score and sound effects but a silent version of the film was also released.

Plot
Set on the Maine coast, a young sloop skipper Bramdlet Dickery discovers a plot to smuggle alien Chinese into the United States. Bramdlet's younger brother Thad is enamored with daughter of the captain of the smuggling ship. A struggle over the smuggling ensues.

Cast
 George O'Brien as Bramdlet Dickery  
 Nora Lane as Emily Godell
 James Gordon as Captain Godell 
 J. Farrell MacDonald as Will Whitten 
 Frank Hagney as Lagune
 Edward Peil, Sr. as Lee Wing 
 David Sharpe as Thad Dickery

References
Masked Emotions at answers.com
Vitaphone Varieties short review and poster of Masked Emotions

External links

1929 films
1929 adventure films
1929 crime drama films
American black-and-white films
American crime drama films
American silent feature films
Films based on short fiction
Films set in Maine
Fox Film films
Seafaring films
American adventure drama films
1929 directorial debut films
1920s American films
Silent American drama films
Silent adventure films